The Interpretation Act 1978 is an Act of the Parliament of the United Kingdom. The Act makes provision for the interpretation of Acts of Parliament, Measures of the General Synod of the Church of England, Measures of the Church Assembly, subordinate legislation, "deeds and other instruments and documents," Acts of the Scottish Parliament and instruments made thereunder (added 1998), and Measures and Acts of the National Assembly for Wales and instruments made thereunder. The Act makes provision in relation to: the construction of certain words and phrases, words of enactment, amendment or repeal of Acts in the Session they were passed, judicial notice, commencement, statutory powers and duties, the effect of repeals, and duplicated offences.  

The Act repealed the whole of the Interpretation Act 1889, except for sections 13(4) and 13(5) and 13(14) in their application to Northern Ireland.

The Interpretation Act (Northern Ireland) 1954 applies in the same way to Acts of the Parliament of Northern Ireland or an Act of the Northern Ireland Assembly.

The Interpretation Act 1978 applies to itself and to any Act passed after the commencement of the Act (section 22) and, to the extent specified in Part I of Schedule 2, to Acts passed before the commencement of the Act.

The Interpretation Act 1978 binds the Crown.

Section 4
This section replaces the corresponding provision of the Acts of Parliament (Commencement) Act 1793. See Coming into force.

Section 5
Section 5 and Schedule 1 provide definitions of certain words and phrases.

Section 6
Unless it is clear there is a contrary intention, wherever in any Act of Parliament or Statutory Instrument there are words importing the masculine gender, the words should be construed to incorporate the feminine and vice versa. Also, words in the singular include the plural, and as with the interchangeability of  words importing gender so it is with the plural and singular.

Section 7
This section replaces section 26 of the Interpretation Act 1889.

Section 8
Section 8 specifies that, in general, a measurement of distance refers to measurement in a straight line on a horizontal plane.

Section 16 – General savings
The following cases are relevant to this section:
Hough v Windus (1884) 12 QBD 224, CA
R v Fisher (Charles) [1969] 1 WLR 8, CA
R v West London Stipendiary Magistrate, ex parte Simeon [1983] AC 234, HL

Section 18 – Duplicated offences
Section 18 provides:

This section replaces section 33 of the Interpretation Act 1889. Humphreys J. said that that section did not add anything to the common law, or detract anything from it.

"... shall not be liable to be punished more than once for the same offence"

The words "same offence" at the end of section 18 do not mean "same act" or "same cause". A person may be punished more than once for the same act. Two prosecutions for a single false statement in a brochure is not oppressive.

See also Williams v Hallam (1943) 112 LJKB 353, (1943) 59 TLR 287, (1943) 41 LGR 165.

"Act"

The word "Act" means Act of Parliament. It includes a local and personal or private Act.

A reference to an Act in this section is a reference to an Act to which this section applies.

This section applies to Acts whenever passed. It applies to Measures of the General Synod of the Church of England, and, so far as it relates to Acts passed before 1 January 1979, to measures of the Church Assembly passed after 28 May 1925, as it applies to Acts. It applies to an Act of the Scottish Parliament as it applies to an "Act".

For the application of this section to subordinate legislation, see section 23. And see also section 23A(2)(b).

Section 19
For section 19(1), see Citation of United Kingdom legislation#Interpretation of citations by year, statute, session, chapter, number or letter

Section 23A
This section was inserted by section 125 of, and paragraph 16(2) of Schedule 8 to, the Scotland Act 1998.

See also
Interpretation Act

References
Halsbury's Statutes. Fourth Edition. 2008 Reissue. Volume 41. Page 796.
Archbold Criminal Pleading, Evidence and Practice. 1999. Appendix A.
Current Law Statutes Annotated 1978

External links

The Interpretation Act 1978, as amended from the National Archives.
The Interpretation Act 1978, as originally enacted from the National Archives.

1978 in law
United Kingdom Acts of Parliament 1978